Sergey Sergeyevich Ushkalov (born February 2, 1972) is a retired male freestyle and backstroke swimmer from Kazakhstan. He competed at the 1996 Summer Olympics in Atlanta, Georgia. His best Olympic result was finishing in 15th place in the Men's 4 × 100 m Medley Relay event.

External links
 
 sports-reference

1972 births
Living people
Kazakhstani male freestyle swimmers
Kazakhstani male backstroke swimmers
Olympic swimmers of Kazakhstan
Swimmers at the 1996 Summer Olympics
Asian Games medalists in swimming
Asian Games silver medalists for Kazakhstan
Asian Games bronze medalists for Kazakhstan
Swimmers at the 1994 Asian Games
Medalists at the 1994 Asian Games
Kazakhstani people of Russian descent
20th-century Kazakhstani people
21st-century Kazakhstani people